Rabbit Software was an English software company which produced video games for home computers such as the ZX Spectrum, VIC-20, and Commodore 64 in the early to mid-1980s. Rabbit's later software packaging was slightly different from that of the other software houses of the time, as the cassettes were encased within an outer red box which made them more distinctive on the shop shelves.

Rabbit went into liquidation around the same time Imagine Software had problems.

Games

Commodore 64
Annihilator
Centropods
Cyclons
Death Star
Escape-MCP
Galleons
Graphics Editor
Lancer Lords
Monopole
Murder
Navarone
Pakacuda
Paratroopers
Potty Painter in the Jungle
Protector
Skramble
Stalag 1
Supercuda
The Colonel's House
Trooper Truck

VIC-20
Alien Soccer
Annihilator
Anti-Matter Splatter
Carrier Attack
The Catch
Centropods
The Colonel's House
Cosmic Battle
Critters
Cyclons
Dam Busta
Dune Buggy
English Invaders
Escape MCP
Frogger
Galactic Crossfire
Grave robbers'HopperJungleKrellLunar RescueMyriadNight CrawlerNight-FlightOrbisPakakudaParatroopersQuackersRabbit ChaseRabbit WriterRace FunSki-RunSkrambleSpace PhreeksSpace StormSuperwormTank-WarZX SpectrumThe BirdsCentropodsDeath StarThe Great Fire of LondonLancer LordsJoustMurderPakacudaParatroopersPhantasiaPotty Painter''

References

Defunct video game companies of the United Kingdom